Kasarwadi is a locality in Pune district, Maharashtra state, India.

Transport 
Kasarwadi Railway Station is the only railway station in the locality.

References 

Cities and towns in Pune district